Razan Rural District may refer to:

Razan Rural District (Hamadan Province)
Razan Rural District (Lorestan Province)